Turkmen goresh (as Traditional wrestling) was contested at the 2017 Asian Indoor and Martial Arts Games in Ashgabat, Turkmenistan from 16 September to 18 September 2017. The competition took place at Ashgabat Main Indoor Arena.

Medalists

Men's freestyle

Men's classic style

Women's freestyle

Women's classic style

Medal table

Results

Men's freestyle

57 kg
16 September

62 kg
16 September

68 kg
16 September

75 kg
16 September

82 kg
16 September

90 kg
16 September

100 kg
16 September

+100 kg
16 September

 Rejepaly Orazalyýew of Turkmenistan originally won the gold medal, but was disqualified after he tested positive for Oxandrolone.

Men's classic style

57 kg
18 September

62 kg
18 September

68 kg
18 September

75 kg
18 September

82 kg
18 September

90 kg
18 September

 Murgapgeldi Atdaýew of Turkmenistan originally won the gold medal, but was disqualified after he tested positive for Methylhexaneamine and 1,3-Dimethylbutylamine.

100 kg
18 September

+100 kg
18 September

 Rejepaly Orazalyýew of Turkmenistan originally won the gold medal, but was disqualified after he tested positive for Oxandrolone.

Women's freestyle

52 kg
16 September

58 kg
16 September

63 kg
16 September

 Gülnar Haýytbaýewa of Turkmenistan originally won the gold medal, but was disqualified after she tested positive for Methylhexaneamine and 1,3-Dimethylbutylamine.
 Dinara Hallyýewa of Turkmenistan originally won the silver medal, but was disqualified after she tested positive for Meldonium.

70 kg
16 September

 Nasiba Surkiýewa of Turkmenistan originally won the gold medal, but was disqualified after she tested positive for Methylhexaneamine and 1,3-Dimethylbutylamine.

+70 kg
16 September

Women's classic style

52 kg
18 September

58 kg
18 September

63 kg
18 September

 Gülnar Haýytbaýewa of Turkmenistan originally won the gold medal, but was disqualified after she tested positive for Methylhexaneamine and 1,3-Dimethylbutylamine.
 Dinara Hallyýewa of Turkmenistan originally finished fifth, but was disqualified after she tested positive for Meldonium.

70 kg
18 September

 Nasiba Surkiýewa of Turkmenistan originally won the gold medal, but was disqualified after she tested positive for Methylhexaneamine and 1,3-Dimethylbutylamine.

+70 kg
18 September

References 

 Medalists by events

External links
 Official website

2017 Asian Indoor and Martial Arts Games events
Asian Indoor and Martial Arts Games
2017